"Week End" is a single released by X Japan (then named X) on April 21, 1990.

Summary 
Differences between this single edit and the album edit, found on Blue Blood, include an alternate guitar solo and an additional piano bridge. The B-side is a live performance of "Endless Rain" recorded on February 4, 1990 at the Nippon Budokan. A live performance of "Week End" was included as the B-side of their 1996 single "Crucify My Love".

Commercial performance 
The song reached number 2 on the Oricon charts, and charted for 16 weeks. In 1990, with 291,440 copies sold was the 32nd best-selling single of the year, being certified Gold by RIAJ.

Track listing

Personnel 
X
Toshi – vocals
Pata – guitar
hide – guitar
Taiji – bass
Yoshiki – drums, piano

Other
 Co-Producer – Naoshi Tsuda
 Recorder and Mixer – Motonari Matsumoto
 Track 2 recorded by Satoshi Takahashi and Takashi Itoh
 Orchestra Arranger and Conductor – Takeshi "Neko" Saitoh
 Photo – Hiroshi Matsuda

References 

1989 songs
1990 singles
Japanese-language songs
Songs written by Yoshiki (musician)
 Songs about suicide
X Japan songs
CBS Records singles